Minage is a tribute album by Spanish recording artist Mónica Naranjo. The album was released on 16 March 2000 by Sony Music. Months later, a special edition was released with the Spanish versions of the two English language songs in the album, "Enamorada" and "If You Leave Me Now". The Spanish version of "If You Leave Me Now" was called "Seguiré sin ti". It achieved platinum status in Spain the day it was released. Minage is a tribute album to Italian singer Mina. All of the songs are Spanish covers of her songs, except "Enamorada" and "If You Leave Me Now" alongside a duet with Mina, Naranjo promoted the album through the Minage Tour and television appearances.

Track listing

Certifications

References

2000 albums
Mónica Naranjo albums
Albums produced by Brian Rawling
Tribute albums